Greg Towns (born 10 January 1954) is a former Australian rules footballer who played for Carlton and Footscray in the Victorian Football League (VFL).

Towns played a lot in the reserves due to the strength of the Carlton side but still made four VFL finals appearances. After he was not picked in the 1979 finals series, where Carlton became premiers, Towns was cleared to Footscray. A Tasmanian, originally from Cooee, Towns represented his state in the 1979 Perth State of Origin Carnival. Greg Towns would later play with Williamstown in the VFA after he left Footscray.

References

Holmesby, Russell and Main, Jim (2007). The Encyclopedia of AFL Footballers. 7th ed. Melbourne: Bas Publishing.

1954 births
Living people
Carlton Football Club players
Western Bulldogs players
Cooee Football Club players
Tasmanian State of Origin players
Australian rules footballers from Tasmania